Phoenix, in comics, may refer to:

 Phoenix, the alias used by a number of Marvel Comics characters connected with the Phoenix Force
Jean Grey, who initially used the alias Marvel Girl in the X-Men
 Rachel Summers, Jean Grey's daughter from an alternate future who is a member of X-Men and Excalibur
 Phoenix (Guardians of the Galaxy), a character from an alternative future who joins the Guardians of the Galaxy
 Phoenix (manga), a manga series by Osamu Tezuka
 The Phoenix (comics), a weekly British comic that began in 2012
 Phoenix, later called the Protector, a short-lived character from Atlas/Seaboard Comics
 Phoenix, the first alias used by Marvel supervillain Helmut Zemo

See also
Phoenix (disambiguation)